This is a list of seasons played by Saba Qom F.C. in Iranian and Asian football, from 2002 to the most recent completed season. It details the club's achievements in major competitions, and the top scorers for each season. Top scorers in bold were also the top scorers in the Iranian league that season.

Seasons

Key

P = Played
W = Games won
D = Games drawn
L = Games lost
F = Goals for
A = Goals against
Pts = Points
Pos = Final position

IPL = Iran Pro League
Div 1 = Azadegan League
ACL = AFC Champions League

See also
Saba Qom F.C.
Takht Jamshid Cup
Azadegan League
Iran Pro League
Hazfi Cup

References
Iran Premier League Stats
RSSSF database about Iranian league football.

 
Saba Qom